Marciano Stores is an American upscale fashion brand, which is owned and operated by Guess Inc named after Guess's co-founder and former CEO, Paul Marciano.  It is the first extension line by Guess and includes clothing such as tops, skirts and dresses, jeans and accessories such as necklaces, earrings and bracelets sold exclusively in Marciano and selected Guess stores.

Strictly a mall-based store (With the exception of the Robson Street location in Vancouver and Ste. Catherine St. location in Montreal), Marciano has stores open in The Grove in Los Angeles, Westfield Santa Anita in Arcadia, CA, The Forum Shops at Caesars Palace in Las Vegas, Galleria Dallas in Dallas, Plaza Las Américas in San Juan, Puerto Rico, Tysons Galleria in McLean, Virginia, and many other locations including some stores in Canada such as at Yorkdale Shopping Centre in Toronto and Metropolis at Metrotown in Vancouver. Marciano has an outlet branch located at the Premium Outlets in Mercedes, Texas, and at the Citadel Outlets in Commerce, California. Guess Inc. is hoping to extend its company by opening more Marciano brand stores nationwide and possibly worldwide once the brand attains higher public recognition.

References

External links 
 marciano.com
 Marciano by Paul Marciano - Interview with the models

Clothing retailers of the United States
Companies based in Los Angeles